TVT may refer to:

Television 
 TVT (TV station), a Tasmanian television station
 KTVT, a television station serving Dallas–Fort Worth metroplex
 Television of Thailand, the national television broadcaster in Thailand
 Togolese Television, the state broadcaster of Togo
 TV Tonight, an Australian media website

Other uses 
 TVT Records, an American record label
 Tension-free vaginal tape
 Tiruvottiyur railway station, in Chennai, Tamil Nadu, India (station code)
 Transmissible venereal tumour
 Tutsa language
 Tuvalu Time, the time zone of Tuvalu
 TV Tropes, a wiki about common practices in media